Olha Bryzhina (maiden name Olga Arkad'evna Vladykina; ; born June 30, 1963 in Krasnokamsk, Perm Oblast) is a retired athlete who represented Soviet Union (until 1991) and later Ukraine.

Career
Bryzhina trained at Dynamo in Voroshilovgrad. Competing in the 400 metres and 4 x 400 metres relay, she was a particularly successful Olympian with three gold medals and one silver. At the 1988 Olympics the Soviet relay team set a new world record of 3:15.17 minutes which is still unbeaten (2022). Bryzhina also became world champion in 1987.

Bryzhina successfully defeated Florence Griffith Joyner at the 1988 Seoul Olympics in the 4 × 400 m relay. Both runners ran the final leg of the relay and took the baton at about the same time. "Flo-Jo" ran a well paced race, chasing Bryzhina closely, and tried to challenge Bryzhina at the 300m point. However, the challenge from Flo-Jo was unsuccessful and Bryzhina won by a 4m margin, taking gold for the Soviet Union along with a new world record for the USSR team. Bryzhina's time of 47.7 seconds in the 1988 Olympic relay is one of the fastest relay legs ever run by a woman in the history of track and field.

Bryzhina's 400m personal best of 48.27 seconds is the women's 4th best result of all time in a laned 400m race. She achieved this in the same race that Marita Koch set the current 400m world record of 47.60 seconds on 6 October 1985 at the Bruce Stadium in Canberra (Australia).

Bryzhina's husband Viktor Bryzhin was also a champion track athlete, winning gold in the 4 × 100 m relay event at the 1988 Olympics. Together they have two daughters, Yelizaveta Bryzhina and Anastasiia Bryzgina, who are also a successful track runners (competing for Ukraine).

Bryzhina and her daughter Yelizaveta both had a best performance of 22.44 seconds over 200m as of December 2012.

Personal bests
200 metres - 22.44 (1985)
400 metres - 48.27 (1985)

Achievements

References

External links

1963 births
Living people
People from Krasnokamsk
Soviet female sprinters
Olympic athletes of the Soviet Union
Olympic athletes of the Unified Team
Olympic gold medalists for the Soviet Union
Olympic gold medalists for the Unified Team
Olympic silver medalists for the Unified Team
Athletes (track and field) at the 1988 Summer Olympics
Athletes (track and field) at the 1992 Summer Olympics
World Athletics record holders (relay)
Dynamo sports society athletes
Ukrainian female sprinters
World Athletics Championships athletes for the Soviet Union
World Athletics Championships medalists
European Athletics Championships medalists
Medalists at the 1992 Summer Olympics
Medalists at the 1988 Summer Olympics
Olympic gold medalists in athletics (track and field)
Olympic silver medalists in athletics (track and field)
Goodwill Games medalists in athletics
Soviet Athletics Championships winners
World Athletics Championships winners
Competitors at the 1986 Goodwill Games
Olympic female sprinters
Friendship Games medalists in athletics